St Cross Church may refer to:
St Cross Church, Oxford
St Cross Church, Appleton Thorn
St Cross Church, Knutsford
St Cross Church, Middleton